Perry Steele Ten Eyck (September 20, 1907 – August 17, 1959) was a college basketball  coach, the head coach at Gonzaga University for the 1932–33 season. A  forward and center, he was the captain of the Golden Bears basketball team at the University of California under head coach Nibs Price.

After offering a ride to two hitchhikers in California in 1959, Ten Eyck was found beaten to death near Ukiah.

References

1907 births
1959 deaths
American men's basketball players
Centers (basketball)
Forwards (basketball)
California Golden Bears men's basketball players
Gonzaga Bulldogs men's basketball coaches
Male murder victims
People murdered in California
American people of Dutch descent
Deaths by beating in the United States